Michael Dwyer (February 4, 1877 – December 28, 1953) was a mining executive and political figure in Nova Scotia, Canada. He represented Cape Breton Centre in the Nova Scotia House of Assembly from 1933 to 1939 as a Liberal member.

Dwyer was born in Ireland in 1877, the son of Richard Dwyer and Bridget Doyle, and came to Canada in 1884. He was educated in New Glasgow, Nova Scotia. In 1907, he married Beatrice S. Campbell. Dwyer was mayor of Sydney Mines from 1926 to 1930. He ran unsuccessfully for a seat in the House of Commons in 1926 and 1930. Dwyer served as Minister of Mines and Public Works and Minister of Labour in the province's Executive Council from 1933 to 1938. He resigned his seat to become president and general manager of the Nova Scotia Steel and Coal Company. Dwyer served as Maritime Regional Superintendent for the National Selective Service (NSS) from 1942 to 1945. He was mayor of New Glasgow from 1949 to 1950. Dwyer died in New Glasgow at the age of 76.

References 
 The Canadian Who's Who, Volume IV, 1948. Trans-Canada Press, Toronto

External links 
 Men in the Mines:A History of Mining Activity in Nova Scotia, 1720-1992, Nova Scotia Archives & Records Management

1877 births
1953 deaths
Mayors of places in Nova Scotia
Members of the Executive Council of Nova Scotia
Nova Scotia Liberal Party MLAs
People from New Glasgow, Nova Scotia
Irish emigrants to Canada (before 1923)